Hugh de Lacy, 1st Earl of Ulster (c. 1176after December 26, 1242) was an Anglo-Norman soldier and peer. He was a leading figure in the Norman invasion of Ireland in the 12th century, and was created Earl of Ulster in 1205 by King John of England.

De Lacy was the younger son of Hugh de Lacy, Lord of Meath, a descendant of Walter de Lacy, who went to England after the Norman conquest. Around 1189, he was appointed Viceroy of Ireland, a position previously held by his father. He was replaced in 1190 by Guillaume le Petil. He was later reappointed to serve as viceroy from 1205 to 1210.

Carlow motte and bailey
He erected a motte in the 1180s in Carlow, on the site of which Carlow Castle was built in the 13th century. When Carlow Castle was excavated in 1996, a series of post-holes was found to lie under the walls of the towered keep, indicating that they pre-dated the keep.

Capture of John de Courcy and Earldom of Ulster
De Lacy was for a time a coadjutor with John de Courcy in Leinster and Munster. But in 1199, King John of England authorised de Lacy to wage war on de Courcy, who had conquered much of Ulster without help or permission from the King. Hugh captured de Courcy in 1204. An account of the capture appears in the Book of Howth.

In 1205, King John created him Earl of Ulster and made what was de Courcy's territory in Ulster the Earldom of Ulster. He granted Drogheda its charter. He continued the conquest of the north-eastern over-kingdom of Ulaid, building on de Courcy's success, with the earldom spanning across the modern counties of Antrim and Down and parts of Londonderry. He tried, without much success, to reduce the O'Neill of Tyrone to submission. In 1207 war broke out between the earl of Ulster and Meiler Fitzhenry, the chief justice. This brought King John in person to Ireland, where he expelled the earl's brother, Walter de Lacy, from Meath, and compelled the earl himself to flee to Scotland. Exiled in 1210 by King John, Hugh took part in the Albigensian Crusade for 13 years.

On his return, he allied himself with O'Neill against the English. In 1226 his lands in Ulster were handed over to his brother Walter, but were restored to him in the following year, after which date he appears to have loyally served the king, being more than once summoned to England to give advice about Irish affairs. He died at Carrickfergus in 1242 or 1243.

Family
He purportedly separated from his first wife and was living adulterously. He had legitimate and natural children, and historic sources give contradictory accounts. There are several references to a daughter Matilda, who married David Fitzwilliam, 3rd Baron of Naas. In 1226, his daughter by his first wife married Alan, Lord of Galloway. He secondly married Emmeline de Riddlesford, the daughter of Walter de Riddlesford about 1242. With Emmeline he had a daughter, Lady Maud de Lacy, who married Walter de Burgh, Lord of Connaught in 1264. He became Earl of Ulster in her right.

Emmeline's second marriage was with Stephen de Longespee, grandson of Henry II of England, by whom she had two daughters: Ela Longespee, Lady of Ashby (1244c. 19 July 1276) and Emmeline Longespee, Lady of Offaly.

References

Norman participants of the invasion of Ireland
Medieval earls of Ulster
Norman warriors
1170s births
1242 deaths
12th-century Irish people
13th-century Irish people
12th-century English people
13th-century English people
Hugh